HKI may refer to:
 Hans Knöll Institute, part of the Beutenberg Campus in Jena, Germany
 Helen Keller International
 Hong Kong Island
 Helsinki, the capital of Finland
 Kirchweyhe railway station, in Weyhe, Germany

See also
 hkis (disambiguation)